St. Anthony Falls in Minneapolis, Minnesota, is the only natural falls on the Mississippi River. Since almost the beginning of settlement in the area by European descendants, the St. Anthony Falls have been used for waterpower. The first allowed settlers were at Ft. Snelling, where construction began in 1820. A sawmill was operating 1821 and a flour mill in 1823. As soon as the land at the sides of the falls became available it was purchased with the intent of using the waterpower of the falls. First lumber mills covered the falls, cutting lumber floated down the Mississippi. After 1870 flour mills started to dominate the area. From 1880 to 1930 the area was the number one flour producer in the US.  In later years, some of the power came from steam, but in 1923 half of the waterpower used was for flour milling.
 Other industries have also used the waterpower.
												
Hydroelectric production started very early in 1881, and the companies that owned the waterpower rights encouraged or developed three early major hydroelectric plants 1894/1911, 1895 and 1908. For comparison, the first large scale production of electricity in the world was at the Adams (Tesla) plant at Niagara Falls starting 1895, which used alternating current. Large scale generation was not practical before alternating current was used. After the third plant was in operation in 1908, 45% of the waterpower being used was for hydroelectric. One of the historic St. Anthony Falls plants is still operating.

Many of the features in this article are contributing resources to the St. Anthony Falls Historic District, which is on the National Register of Historic Places.

Origin of St Anthony Falls 
About 13,000 years ago Glacial River Warren drained Glacial Lake Agassiz in a huge flow of water that produced a waterfall that progressed up the Mississippi, then up the Minnesota River. As it passed through St. Paul 13,000 years ago, the waterfall was a barely imaginable 2700 ft wide and 175 ft high. When the waterfall went past the Mississippi - Minnesota River confluence 10,000 years ago it left an approximately 180 ft high waterfall from the Mississippi river to the north. That waterfall progressed up the Mississippi producing a deep gorge and the remains of the waterfall is at St. Anthony Falls.

The power that can be derived from a falls (or dam) is determined by the flow rate and "head". The head is the difference in elevation between the pond above the falls and the water level below the falls. At St. Anthony falls the head is 49 ft., including the falls and the horseshoe dam. The head (lift) at the Ford dam (Lock and Dam No. 1) 6 miles downstream is 38 ft., and that is the largest (or tied) lift/head at any dam downstream on the Mississippi. The natural drop in elevation in the short 6 miles that includes the falls, the lower dam and the Ford dam is 97 ft, or 111 ft. if the horseshoe dam is included. All of that is the remains of the 'great waterfall'. And it is over 25% of the change in elevation from St. Anthony Falls to below the last lock and dam on the Mississippi.

The companies that developed waterpower at the falls built a v-shaped dam above the falls to divide the water between the east and west side developments. The dams also increased the "head". The  Upper (Horseshoe) Dam is successor to those dams. The Eastman tunnel disaster was fixed with a dike, but at the same time the falls were encased in a sloping wood timber apron. The current concrete spillway is the successor to that apron.

Waterpower rights 
Rights to use the St. Anthony Falls waterpower was controlled by the owners of the land on the west and east bank The Minneapolis Mill Company (west bank) and the St. Anthony Falls Water Power Company (east bank) were chartered by the territorial legislature of Minnesota in 1856, and each was granted a perpetual right to use half the water flowing in the river. Those waterpower companies then leased specific flow rates (in "millpowers") to companies that actually used the water. Those waterpower rights are now owned by NSP (see NSP below) except some rights that came from Minneapolis that are owned by the St. Anthony Falls Laboratory
. If Crown Hydro ever runs it would have to lease rights from NSP. The Pillsbury A-mill has leased rights that have been kept up down to the present owner (and should give the A-mill priority to use water over the Crown Hydro project). NSP (the Hennepin Island Hydroelectric Plant), the St. Anthony Falls Laboratory and the Pillsbury A-mill project are the only current users of waterpower at the falls.

Much later FERC (the Federal Energy Regulatory Commission) licenses hydropower projects. There are four FERC licenses in the area

They are for the Hennepin Island Hydroelectric Plant, the A-mill project, SAF at the lower dam and the proposed Crown Hydro project.

Note that "east bank" and "west bank" are as they would be if the river was straightened out. The "west" bank is the south side of the river in this area. Other than that, directions are normal compass directions.

Brush Electric Central Station 1882 
In 1881 the Pillsbury "A" Mill added a hydroelectric Brush Electric plant, which may have been the first installation in a flour mill in the world. The Washburn mill and several other buildings installed their own Brush Systems. The Brush Systems were a generator that powered arc-lights (this was just before incandescent lights were practical).

Coordinates: 
ApproximateThe Minnesota Brush Electric Co., built a plant on Upton Island, on the west bank. It produced power starting September 1882 eventually using five water powered Brush generators., and became the third hydroelectric "Central Station" (supplying multiple users) hydroelectric plant in the US. Soon Minneapolis street lights were added, including a 257 ft high tower at Bridge Square. For comparison, Edison's Pearl Street Station also started producing electric power September 1882 (using steam). Not only is the Brush central station long gone, the remains of Upton Island were removed when the locks were installed in the 1960s.

Waterpower was not entirely reliable, so in 1894 the generators were moved to the West Side Power Plant 
 near 3rd Avenue North and West River Road This was the first steam powered electric plant in Minneapolis. In 1886 generators were added for incandescent lights. In 1895 the generators were moved to the Main Street Station.

Main Street Station 1894 1911  
Coordinates: 

William de la Barre was the chief engineer for the waterpower companies. He was interested in maximizing the efficiency of waterpower use at the west side of the falls. One way was to maximize the "head" used by enlarging the headrace water power canal and making sure the turbines were near the water level below the falls. The goal was to use the entire "head".

The west bank "power canal" supplied water to numerous mills. The east bank was less effective in waterpower use. It had a tunnel that supplied the huge Pillsbury A-mill plus another mill. Plus there were sawmills that operated at the edge of the falls. De la Barre saw the potential of using the waterpower to generate electricity. He offered to lease some waterpower to Minneapolis General Electric. GE combined that with other waterrights, including from sawmills that had burned down, and built the Main Street Station at the falls, constructed 1894-1895. About 38% of the generation was from waterpower (the rest was steam).

The original station burned down and a new one was built in 1911 that used only waterpower for three 480 kW generators. 
The Plant was the "main generating facility" for the city, so Minneapolis General Electric wanted the plant back in operation rapidly. That resulted in a plant that was significantly more primitive than the 1908 Hennepin Island Hydroelectric Plant built three years earlier. The turbines survived the fire and were reused. That required the new generators be powered by a "rope drive" (rope used as a drive belt), and the electrical production was far smaller than the Hennepin Island Plant. The Station continued to produce electricity until 1968 Shown in the picture, the plant is very visible at 206 Main St.. One side, with intake gates, is against the upper pond. A dam was built in 2000 to protect that side (it is now the access to a Water Power Park).

 
The visible part of the plant is above the limestone cap that forms the Falls. The east-side channel of the river (around Hennepin Island) used to flow through where the Plant is and over the east-channel Falls
 
about 300 ft. downstream from the Plant. The Plant was built between Hennepin Island and the east bank.

Lower dam 1895 1953 2011 
Coordinates:

Right after the Main Street Station, de la Barre built a "lower dam" and the lower dam hydroelectric powerhouse about a half mile below the falls. Construction was 1895-1897. This was the first dam built exclusively for hydroelectric generation in Minnesota. and had a much larger electrical capacity plant than any other plant in the state. The plant also used an innovative horizontal shaft direct mechanical connection between turbines and generators instead of a belt drive common previously. Power was sold to the streetcar company (TCRT), which was replacing old streetcars with electric streetcars starting 1889. Generation was 35 Hz (8 generators) and DC (2 generators), 8.5 megawatt using a 19 ft head.

About 1950 electric streetcars were replaced by buses and The TCRT no longer bought power. At the same time the Corps of Engineers rebuilt the dam adding a lock and auxiliary lock, and creating a higher 24 ft. head. By 1953 the plant had been modified to be 60 Hz, 8.25 megawatts, 10 generators using vertical shafts. The new dam, completed 1956, incorporated the section of old dam including the powerhouse. 

In 1987 a large hole eroded under the powerplant that drained the upper pond. The powerhouse was damaged and was removed 1988. Reconstructing a powerplant was determined to not be feasible. (The lower dam is outside the St. Anthony Falls Historic District.)

Coordinates:
In the same area, the Southeast Steam Plant was constructed 1903 at the east bank end of the Stone Arch Bridge, also to power streetcars.

Coordinates:
More recently, a hydroelectric power generating system was installed in the auxiliary lock at the lower dam. The project, by Brookfield/SAF Hydropower, is 8.98-megawatt and was online December 2011.
 
FERC license 12451 was issued in 2016 to "SAF Hydroelectric" for project "Lower St. Anthony Falls", expires 2056.

Hennepin Island Hydroelectric Plant 1908 

Coordinates:

In yet another De la Barre project, 1906-1908 he designed and built the Hennepin Island Hydroelectric Plant.  It is located near the center of Hennepin Island and is not very visible. A 400 ft. headrace canal connects the plant to the upper pond..

The plant was the first in the US to use "surplus power". Waterpower users had a right to a specified flow. The plant operated on flow that was above that total amount.

The plant originally produced power at 35 Hz, 9.9 megawatts, using four horizontal shaft direct drive generators. The total output was leased to Minneapolis General Electric who subleased it to the streetcar system.

In 1955 as streetcars were replaced by buses the plant was converted to 60 Hz and a fifth generator was added for a total capacity of 12.4 megawatts. The fifth generator was vertical shaft, with the turbine below the generator. This places the turbine at a lower level than horizontal shaft setups, which allows the available head to be better used. Vertical shaft installations were not practical until bearings were developed that could bear the weight of the generator rotor.

The rotating turbine "runners" were replaced and generators were rewound, completed 2013. The historic turbine outer shells were not affected. The changes raised the capacity from 12.4 megawatts to 13.9 megawatts and raised the maximum flow from 4,025 cfs to 4,366 cfs.

This is the only historic plant still in operation.

FERC license 2056 was reissued in 2004 (amended 2011) to "Northern States Power Co (MN)" for project "St. Anthony Falls", expires 2034. This license also covers significant parts of the Falls, including the horseshoe dam and the dams across the end of Hennepin Island from the horseshoe dam to the east bank. In the past the Main Street Station, lower dam and Consolidated Hydro have been under this license.

Consolidated Hydro Plant 
As west bank flour mills left the Falls and the buildings were torn down, Northern States Power used the turbines at seven of the sites to generate 2.73 megawatts of electricity. This was called the Consolidated Hydro Plant. Construction of the lock at the falls blocked the "power canal" which was the headrace for the hydro sites, ending the Consolidated Hydroelectric Plant 1959.

A-Mill Artist Lofts 2016 
Coordinates: 

The Pillsbury "A" Mill 
is on the east bank at Main Street and Third Ave Southeast. The mill dominated Main St. when built in 1881 and was the largest flour mill in the world for forty years. It had a headrace tunnel, 
two drop pits for two turbines, and two tailrace tunnels. All but the top half of the headrace is constructed in bedrock.

The Mill ended waterpower use in 1955 and ended flour production in 2003.

The Mill was converted to the income limited A-Mill Artist Lofts by Dominium in 2015. As part of that conversion a hydroelectric plant was installed with a 5 ft. diameter penstock pipe in the much larger headrace tunnel, a turbine and generator in the east dropshaft and a concrete conduit in the much larger east tailrace tunnel. All that can be seen of the project is the intake trashrack and gate driver at the riverbank at Second Ave. Southeast and water out of the east tailrace tunnel. Production up to 0.6 megawatts, about 17% of the waterpower used by Pillsbury.
 On-line 2016. 

This facility is nicely built to view the historic waterpower features, including a glass floor above one of the dropshafts. If the city or state ever comes up with reasonable code requirements there is also easy access into the headrace tunnel.

FERC license 14628 was issued in 2015 to "Minneapolis Leased Housing Assn IV" for project "A-mill Artist Lofts", 0.6 megawatts, expires 2065.

Northern States Power 
Northern States Power Co is the corporate successor to the historic hydroelectric projects in this article, and wound up with the historic assets - three hydroelectric plants (one still operating, one demolished) and most of the water rights.

The Minnesota Brush Electric Company was absorbed by the Minneapolis General Electric Co. by 1893. In 1912 Consumers Power acquired the Minneapolis General Electric Company (and Main Street Station).
Consumers Power reorganized in 1916 and became Northern States Power

The St. Anthony Falls Water Power Company built the Lower Dam and Hydroelectric Plant, then the Hennepin Island Hydroelectric Plant. The St. Anthony Falls Water Power Company and Minneapolis Mill Company merged into the Pillsbury-Washburn Flour Mills Company in 1889. Assets wound up with Pillsbury Flour Mills Company in 1923, and that year the waterpower companies (and the Lower Dam Hydroelectric Plant, and Hennepin Island Hydroelectric Plant and the waterpower rights) were sold to a subsidiary of Northern States Power. The waterpower companies became a direct part of NSP in 1937.

NSP became part of Xcel Energy in 2000 through mergers.

It is now Northern States Power Company (d/b/a Xcel Energy).

Under its FERC licence, NSP/Xcel is responsible for elements that maintain the falls including the apron/spillway, the horseshoe dam and several dams holding the upper pond. (The dike that fixed the Eastman tunnel disaster is not included.)

Water over the falls 

The 2004 FERC license renewal for NSP (the Hennepin Island Power Plant) requires a minimum flow over the Falls 2 inches deep. That translates to a flow of about 100 cfs (cubic feet per second). If the flow drops below that NSP has to reduce its water flow. The requirement actually is that the flow is required only when people are likely to be present, during daylight, and not in the winter.

The revised A-mill FERC licence allows the A-mill to use water when there is flow more than what NSP requires, with the same requirement of 100 cfs over the Falls.

The 2004 NSP license renewal also requires that NSP execute an Aesthetic Flow Adequacy Plan that determines what the flow should be. That includes opinion surveys from people at the falls using pictures of different flow rates. The report from NSP to FERC was issued March 30, 2017 and recommends a minimum flow of 300 cfs all the time. 
 
The Minneapolis Park Board, and others, want a minimum flow of 2000 cfs. FERC will eventually decide what the minimum flow rate should be (hasn't happened by May 6, 2019). This is currently a hot issue.

Proposals for new hydroelectric plants

Crown Hydro 

The original Crown Hydro FERC license was for two generators, 3.4 megawatts total, with the generators located in the west bank Crown Roller Mill building, presumably using the original wheel pits and tailraces. Crown Hydro couldn't come to an agreement with the building owner.

Crown Hydro then proposed a license change locating the generators at the former Fuji-Ya Restaurant site. The Minneapolis Park Board said it owned the site and opposed the change. FERC determined that the Park Board did own the site and Crown Hydro had no way to use it.

Crown Hydro then proposed another license change locating the generators about 250 ft. north of the Crown Roller Mill on property owned by the Corps of Engineers (associated with the locks). This location results in potential impact to numerous historic properties, particularly from a new tailrace tunnel. That requires a Section 106 review (which protects historically significant properties such as the Ida Dorsey Bordello). Review is ongoing. There is, however, strong opposition to this project, including by the Park Board.

FERC license 11175 was issued in 1999 to "Crown Hydro. LLC" for project "Crown Mill", 3.4 megawatts, expires 2049.

Symphony Hydro 

Symphony Hydro proposes putting generator panels inside one of the locks (which are inactive to control "flying carp"). Generation capacity would be 3.4 megawatts. This proposal would be dropped if the currently 20 year old Crown Hydro project progresses. Symphony has a preliminary FERC permit, and appears to still be alive.

See also
List of contributing properties in the St. Anthony Falls Historic District
Pillsbury A-Mill

References

References cited

External links 
 
The application from the City of Minneapolis to the National Park Service to place the St. Anthony Falls Historic District on the National Register of Historic Places (it was placed there).
Consists of the original 1971 section and a much longer 1991 addition. It doesn't read like a book, but has extensive information on the significance of the district and descriptions of "contributing resources". Of particular interest are descriptions of the sites and the equipment that is (or was) inside.

 
A heavily footnoted standard history of the development at the Falls.

  

Mississippi River
Minneapolis
Hydroelectric power plants in Minnesota